Anna Dormitzer (1830–1903) (née Essroger) was an inventor, mother to seven children and a member of the National American Woman Suffrage Association. She received sixteen patents in her lifetime making her part of fifteen percent of women inventors to receive multiple patents.

Early life 

Dormitzer was born in Prague, Czech Republic on May 5, 1830. She emigrated to the United States arriving in New York at the age of 20 years in 1850. She married her husband, Henry Dormitzer the same year and they settled in Hoboken, New Jersey where Henry made his fortune in the tobacco business. After retiring the couple moved to New York City where they were both became active in politics. Dormitzer was a suffragette, a member of the National-American Woman Suffrage Association and the Sorosis Society.

Professional career 
While the Dormitzers were rich enough that they could afford to hire servants to do household tasks such as cleaning windows, Anna Dormitzer was sensitive to the precarious dangers of cleaning, particularly window-cleaning so much so that starting in 1878, she registered twelve patents for a variety of window washing devices. These included chairs and stepladders and a combination of both. Dormitzer included very precise and detailed drawings with her applications since all but her first application included a model.
 Window-Cleaning Step-Chair, Aug. 13, 1878
 Window-Cleaning Chair, Sept. 2, 1878
 Window-Cleaning Chair, July 12, 1881
 Combined Window Cleaning Chair and Fire Escape, Apr. 18, 1882
 Window Cleaning Chair, Feb. 12, 1884
 Window Cleaning Chair, June 9, 1885
 Window Cleaning Chair, Feb. 2, 1886
 Ornamental Step Ladder, Feb. 16, 1886
 Paint and Brush Bucket, May 25, 1886
 Safety Watch Pocket, Mar. 27, 1888
 Step Ladder, Feb. 25, 1890
 Step Ladder, Apr. 7, 1891
 Ornamental Step Ladder, Jan. 3, 1893
 Chair for Washing Windows, May 30, 1893
 Napkin Holder, Sept. 24, 1895
 Napkin Holder, May 5, 1896

Death and legacy 
Anna Dormitzer died on May 2, 1903, in New York City. Her husband Henry died several years later in 1911 and they are both buried in Green-Wood Cemetery in Brooklyn, New York.

Collections 
 Patent Model - Window-Cleaning Step-Chairs, 1878, Patent no. 206,936, Hagley Museum and Library, Wilmington, DE

References 

American inventors
Women inventors
1830 births
1903 deaths
People from Prague
People from New York City
Czech emigrants to the United States